The Woburn Sands Formation is a geological formation in England. Part of the Lower Greensand Group, it is the only unit of the group where it occurs, and thus is sometimes simply referred to as the 'Lower Greensand' in these areas. It was deposited during the late Aptian to early Albian stages of the Early Cretaceous. The lithology consists of sandstone or loose sand with rare wisps or thin seams of clay. The formation was extensively exploited in the 19th century for the "coprolite industry", with coprolite being a local term referring to phosphate nodules of varying origins (often the internal moulds of shells), named due to their resemblance to real coprolites. The formation contains reworked fossils of late Tithonian-Berriasian age from deposits that are no longer found locally, equivalent in age to the Sandringham Sand Formation in Norfolk and the Spilsby Sandstone of Lincolnshire, these include Dicranodonta and the ammonite Subcraspedites. Reworked dinosaur material is known from the Potton locality within the formation.

References

Rock formations of England
Geologic formations of the United Kingdom
Aptian Stage
Albian Stage
Lower Cretaceous Series of Europe